Awakatek may refer to:

 Awakatek people, an ethnic group of Guatemala
 Awakatek language, a Mayan language